Rashmi Narzary is an Indian writer of Bodo origin, who writes in English language. She is best known for her children's book His Share of Sky (2012), for which she won the Sahitya Akademi Award in 2016.

Her debut novel, BLOODSTONE, Legend of the Last Engraving, is a literally, socially and academically acclaimed work that has inspired research papers on gender studies. Her other works include Mosaic, Colors of Life,  a collection of short stories on human relations and emotions, and Looking Beyond, stories of hope and life experiences of children at the Snehalaya House of Love.

Her translated works include some of the late Dr. Bhabendra Nath Saikia's  award winning Assamese stories into English.

Starting her education in Pine Mount School, Shillong, Narzary graduated in Economics from Cotton College, now Cotton University. She did her Post Graduation in Human Resource Management from Symbiosis.

Rashmi Narzary's work has been translated into other Indian and foreign languages and is taught in Universities. 

She lives in Guwahati.

Spouse : Hemanta Narzary, former IAS officer, presently Special Monitor, National Human Rights Commission 

Daughter: Dr. Sandhya Narzary 

Son : Jairaj Narzary 

Awards

Sahitya Akademi for Children’s Literature, 2016

Prag Prerona Award for Literature, 2020

https://asiawa.jpf.go.jp/en/culture/features/f-yomu-india-rashmi-narzary/

https://pipparannbooks.com/the-many-that-i-am-writings-from-nagaland/

http://pipparannbooks.com/the-village-maestro-100-other-stories/

References 

Living people
Indian writers
Indian women writers
Year of birth missing (living people)